The Papua New Guinea Independence Act 1975 was an Act passed by the Parliament of Australia. It replaced the Papua and New Guinea Act 1949, and changed the status of the Territory of Papua and New Guinea to that of an independent Papua New Guinea. The Act set 16 September 1975 as date of Papua New Guinea's independence and terminated all remaining sovereign and legislative powers of Australia over the country.

References

Australia and the Commonwealth of Nations
Papua New Guinea and the Commonwealth of Nations
Politics of Papua and New Guinea
1975 in Australian law
1975 in Papua New Guinea
1975 in international relations
Acts of the Parliament of Australia
Politics of Papua New Guinea